Hassle is the debut studio album by Swedish pop singer Erik Hassle. The album was released on 19 August 2009 in Sweden, and features the top 30 singles "Hurtful" and "Don't Bring Flowers". The album peaked at number two on the Swedish Albums Chart.

Track listing

Charts

References

2009 debut albums
Erik Hassle albums